Carpathian Peak is a prominent  mountain summit located in the Kenai Mountains, in the U.S. state of Alaska. Although modest in elevation, relief is significant since the eastern aspect of the mountain rises from sea level at Blackstone Bay in Prince William Sound. The mountain's name was officially adopted in 1959 by the United States Geological Survey. The 1959 first ascent party of Keith Hart, Ted Barrett, and Mat Nitsch suggested the name as a tribute to the Carpathian Mountains back in Mat's homeland which at the time was behind the Iron Curtain, with the intention to create a symbol of freedom.

Climate

Based on the Köppen climate classification, Carpathian Peak is located in a subarctic climate zone with long, cold, snowy winters, and mild summers. Temperatures can drop below −20 °C with wind chill factors below −30 °C. This climate supports the Skookum Glacier on the west side, Portage Glacier to the north, and the Spencer Glacier on its south and east aspects. The months May through July offer the most favorable weather for viewing or climbing this peak.

See also

List of mountain peaks of Alaska
Geography of Alaska

References

Gallery

External links

 Weather forecast: Carpathian Peak
 Weather: NOAA Whittier, AK
 Speed flying Carpathian Peak: YouTube

Mountains of Alaska
Kenai Mountains-Turnagain Arm National Heritage Area
Mountains of Kenai Peninsula Borough, Alaska
North American 1000 m summits